Acalolepta basicornis is a species of beetle in the family Cerambycidae. It was described by Charles Joseph Gahan in 1895. It is known from Laos, China, India, Vietnam, and Myanmar.

References

Acalolepta
Beetles described in 1895